Mercedes Mendoza Suasti (May 7, 1927 – May 17, 2020) was an Ecuadorian singer.

References

1927 births
2020 deaths
20th-century Ecuadorian male singers